Housesteads Roman Fort is the remains of an auxiliary fort on Hadrian's Wall, at Housesteads, Northumberland, England, south of Broomlee Lough. The fort was built in stone around AD 124, soon after the construction of the wall began in AD 122 when the area was part of the Roman province of Britannia. Its name has been variously given as Vercovicium, Borcovicus, Borcovicium, and Velurtion. The 18th-century farmhouse Housesteads gives the modern name. The site is owned by the National Trust and is in the care of English Heritage. Finds can be seen at the site, in the museum at Chesters, and in the Great North Museum: Hancock in Newcastle upon Tyne.

History

Hadrian's Wall was begun in AD 122. A fort was built in stone at the Housesteads Roman Fort site around AD 124 overlying the original Broad Wall foundation and Turret 36B, about two miles north east of an existing fort at Vindolanda. The fort was repaired and rebuilt several times, its northern defences being particularly prone to collapse. A substantial civil settlement (vicus) existed to the south, outside the fort, and some of the stone foundations can still be seen, including the so-called "Murder House", where two skeletons were found beneath an apparently newly-laid floor when excavated.

In the 2nd century AD, the garrison consisted of an unknown double-sized auxiliary infantry cohort and a detachment of legionaries from Legio II Augusta. In the 3rd century, it comprised Cohors I Tungrorum, augmented by the numerus Hnaudifridi and the Cuneus Frisiorum, a Frisian cavalry unit, cuneus referring to a wedge formation. The Tungrians were still there in the 4th century, according to the Notitia Dignitatum. By 409 AD the Romans had withdrawn.

Most other early forts straddle the Wall and therefore protrude into barbarian territory. It is also unusual for Britain in that it has no running water supply and is dependent upon rainwater collection (for which purpose there is a series of large stone-lined tanks around the periphery of the defences). It also has one of the best-preserved stone latrines in Roman Britain.

The name of the fort has been given as Borcovicus,  Borcovicium, and Velurtion. An inscription found at Housesteads with the letters VER, is believed to be short for Ver(covicianorum) – the letters ver being interchangeable with bor in later Latin.  The name of the 18th-century farmhouse of Housesteads provides the modern name.

The site is now owned by the National Trust and is currently in the care of English Heritage. Finds from Vercovicium can be seen in the site museum, in the museum at Chesters, and in the Great North Museum: Hancock in Newcastle upon Tyne.

Housesteads farm

Housesteads is a former farm whose lands include the ruins of the fort. In 1604 Hugh Nixon, "Stealer of cattle and receiver of stolen goods", became the tenant of Housesteads farm. From 1663, Housesteads was the home of the Armstrongs, a notorious family of Border Reivers. Nicholas Armstrong bought the farm in 1692, only to have to sell it again in 1694 to Thomas Gibson of Hexham for the sum of £485. They remained as tenants. They were a well-known band of horse thieves and cattle rustlers who used the old  fort as a place to hold the stolen horses and cattle. They traded as far afield as Aberdeen and the south of England. At one time every male member of the family was said to have been a 'broken man', formally outlawed by English or Scottish authorities. Nicholas was hanged in 1704, and his brothers fled to America. The Armstrongs lived in a typical 16th-century defensive bastle house of two storeys: the ground floor for livestock and the upper level for living quarters. Its ruins remain built up against the south gate of the Roman fort, with external stone steps and narrow loop windows. A corn-drying kiln was inserted into the gate's guard chamber in the 17th century.

In 1698, the farm had been sold to Thomas Gibson who turned the land around the fort to agriculture and thus ploughed up numerous Roman artefacts. The 17th-century bastle house was replaced by a farmhouse located over the Roman hospital, which was sketched by William Stukeley in 1725. Throughout the 18th century Housesteads was farmed by a single tenant farming family. Since Hodgson recorded the presence of William Magnay as the tenant during that period this fixes the tenure. In particular, the well (thought to be Roman) was documented as having actually been built by William, and used by the family as a bath. Interest in the fort increased in the 19th century, particularly after the farm was purchased by the amateur historian John Clayton in 1838, to add to his collection of Roman Wall farms. The Roman site was cleared of later buildings by Clayton, and the present farmhouse built about 1860. John Maurice Clayton attempted to auction the fort in 1929. It did not reach its reserve and was donated to the National Trust in 1930. The farm was later owned by the Trevelyans who gave the land for the site museum.

See also
 History of Northumberland

References

Sources
 Crow, J. Housesteads Roman Fort and its Environs, Univ. of Newcastle 1994
 Crow, J. Housesteads, London: Batsford (1995) (second edition, Stroud: Tempus 2004)

Further reading
 
 Dodds, Glen Lyndon, (2002) Historic Sites of Northumberland & Newcastle upon Tyne pp 96–103
 
 Gibson papers, Northumberland Record Office (NRO)
 John Hodgson, History of Northumberland vol III part II page 288
 Rivet, A. L. F. The Place-Names of Roman Britain, London: Batsford (1979)

External links

 Hadrian's Wall and Housesteads Fort – National Trust
 History and visitor information: English Heritage

Roman fortifications in England
Roman sites in Northumberland
Forts of Hadrian's Wall
History of Northumberland
Former populated places in Northumberland
National Trust properties in Northumberland
Museums in Northumberland
Museums of ancient Rome in the United Kingdom
Archaeological museums in England